The 1988  Pittsburgh Steelers season was the franchise's 56th in the National Football League. Hall of Fame team founder and owner Art Rooney died at age 87 less than two weeks before the start of the season on August 25. The team wore AJR patches on the left shoulder the entire season in memory of "The Chief".

The team finished the season at 5–11 failing to improve on their 8-7 record from 1987, and had their worst record since finishing an NFL-worst 1–13 in 1969. As of 2020, the 5–11 mark remains the team's worst record since 1969, and they have only finished with ten losses twice since, in 1999 and 2003. 

The Steelers got off to a disappointing start. After winning their home opener against the Dallas Cowboys, the team lost six straight, their first six-game losing streak since 1969. The team never recovered after the skid, and at one point had a 2–10 record after a 27–7 loss to the Cleveland Browns. It was the Steelers worst start to a season since the merger. The Steelers did, however, finish the season on a positive note, winning 3 of their last 4 games to finish the season 5-11. To date, this represents the only time since the AFL-NFL merger the Steelers have finished the season last place in their division.

Chuck Noll controversy
During the season, due to the team's struggles there were calls from the media and fans for longtime head coach Chuck Noll to step down, particularly after an embarrassing loss to the eventual AFC champions Cincinnati Bengals 42-7. Following that game, Noll said that everyone "should go out and get law degrees", in reference to cornerback Dwayne Woodruff having recently passed the bar exam in preparation for his law career after he retired as well as Woodruff's bad game against the Bengals.

Following the season, Noll intended to resign until defensive line coach Joe Greene got word and informed Dan Rooney (who had considered firing Noll), leading to Rooney and Noll to make some compromises. In exchange for lifetime employment with the team (Noll would be listed in media guides as an administrative advisor from his retirement from coaching until his death in 2014), Noll agreed to part ways with several members of his coaching staff.

One negative side effect to Noll making changes to his coaching staff was the loss of defensive coordinator Tony Dungy. Rooney wanted Dungy demoted to defensive backs coach, but Dungy opted to leave for the Kansas City Chiefs, taking the same position with that team and working under their defensive coordinator--and Noll's eventual replacement--Bill Cowher. While Dungy would go on to have a Hall of Fame career as head coach of the Tampa Bay Buccaneers and Indianapolis Colts, the loss of Dungy likely delayed his eventual ascension to head coach in the NFL.

Personnel

Staff

Roster

Offseason 
The Steelers saw two of its last three remaining players who won all four Super Bowls retire in wide receiver John Stallworth and strong safety Donnie Shell, who were both from the team's famous Class of 1974 that saw four players go on to the Pro Football Hall of Fame (although Shell was undrafted, he was still from the same rookie class), and in the case of Stallworth, retired as the team's all-time leading receiver. (Stallworth's record was surpassed by Hines Ward in 2005.)

Mike Webster, who was also from the Class of 1974, entered the season as the sole remaining member of all four Super Bowl teams. However, change appeared to be imminent when the team drafted Kentucky guard Dermontti Dawson in the second round of the 1988 draft. Although Dawson would be playing guard his rookie season alongside Webster, it was apparent that Dawson was drafted to be groomed as Webster's eventual replacement at center. Webster would be released by the Steelers in the following offseason, officially ending the team's link to all four Super Bowl clubs.

To the delight of Steelers fans, and even most of the players, the Mark Malone era officially ended in the offseason as well. Malone, who had lost the starting quarterback job to Bubby Brister the previous year, was traded to the San Diego Chargers during the offseason. Malone had also become hugely unpopular with fans and teammates for blaming his mistakes on other players and acting as if he were the "heir" to the QB position after the retirement of Terry Bradshaw. At one point, a locker room fight between Malone and the rest of the team ensued before being broken up by veteran offensive tackle Tunch Ilkin.

Preseason

Schedule

Regular season

Schedule

Game summaries

Week 1  

Scoring drives:

 Dallas – Newsome 3 run (Zendejas kick)
 Pittsburgh – Jackson 15 run (Anderson kick)
 Pittsburgh – FG Anderson 32
 Pittsburgh – Brister 1 run (Anderson kick)
 Dallas – Irvin 35 pass from Pelluer (Zendejas kick)
 Pittsburgh – Jackson 29 run (Anderson kick)
 Dallas – Alexander 8 pass from Pelluer (Zendejas kick)

Week 2  

Scoring drives:

 Pittsburgh – FG Anderson 33
 Washington – Clark 55 pass from Williams (Lohmiller kick)
 Pittsburgh – FG Anderson 24
 Washington – FG Lohmiller 37
 Pittsburgh – Lipps 80 pass from Brister (Anderson kick)
 Pittsburgh – Brister 6 run (kick failed)
 Washington – Morris 1 run (Lohmiller kick)
 Washington – FG Lohmiller 46
 Pittsburgh – Stone 72 pass from Brister (Anderson kick)
 Pittsburgh – FG Anderson 43
 Washington – Bryant 7 pass from Williams (Lohmiller kick)
 Washington – FG Lohmiller 19

Week 3

Week 4 

Scoring drives:

 Buffalo – FG Norwood 38
 Buffalo – Burkett 26 pass from Kelly (Norwood kick)
 PIttsburgh – Brister 1 run (Anderson kick)
 Buffalo – FG Norwood 39
 Pittsburgh – W. Williams 5 pass from Brister (Anderson kick)
 Buffalo – FG Norwood 39
 Buffalo – Riddick 1 run (Norwood kick)
 Buffalo – Riddick 5 blocked punt return (Norwood kick)
 Buffalo – FG Norwood 48
 Buffalo – FG Norwood 49
 Pittsburgh – Brister 1 run (Anderson kick)
 Pittsburgh – Thompson 42 pass from Brister (Anderson kick)

Week 5   

Scoring drives:

 Pittsburgh – FG Anderson 49
 Pittsburgh – FG Anderson 35
 Cleveland – Manoa 1 run (Bahr kick)
 Pittsburgh – FG Anderson 45
 Cleveland – FG Bahr 22
 Cleveland – FG Bahr 21
 Cleveland – Washington 75 interception return (Bahr kick)
 Cleveland – FG Bahr 40

Week 6  

Scoring drives:

 Phoenix – Awalt 32 pass from Lomax (Del Greco kick)
 Pittsburgh – Woodson 92 kickoff return (Anderson kick)
 Phoenix – FG Del Greco 19
 Phoenix – Jordan 1 run (Del Greco kick)
 Phoenix – J. T. Smith 13 pass from Lomax (Del Greco kick)
 Phoenix – J. T. Smith 3 pass from Lomax (Del Greco kick)
 Pittsburgh – Hoge 12 pass from Bono (Anderson kick)

Week 7  

Scoring drives:

 Houston – Rozier 2 run (pass failed)
 Houston – FG Zendejas 50
 Houston – Safety, Seale blocked punt out of end zone
 Houston – Givins 43 pass from Moon (Zendejas kick)
 Pittsburgh – Lockett 9 pass from Blackledge (Anderson kick)
 Houston – Pinkett 1 run (Zendejas kick)
 Houston – FG Zendejas 27
 Houston – Hill 24 pass from Moon (kick failed)
 Pittsburgh – Hoge 1 run (Anderson kick)

Week 8  

Scoring drives:

 Pittsburgh – Carter 64 run (Anderson kick)
 Pittsburgh – Blackledge 1 run (Anderson kick)
 Pittsburgh – FG Anderson 30
 Pittsburgh – Carter 10 pass from Blackledge (Anderson kick)
 Pittsburgh – FG Anderson 32
 Denver – Kay 17 pass from Kubiak (Karlis kick)
 Pittsburgh – FG Anderson 21
 Pittsburgh – FG Anderson 37
 Pittsburgh – FG Anderson 22
 Denver – Kay 14 pass from Kubiak (Karlis kick)
 Denver – Nattiel 74 pass from Karcher (Karlis kick)
 Pittsburgh – FG Anderson 30

Week 9  

Scoring drives:

 Pittsburgh – FG Anderson 25
 Pittsburgh – Carter 24 pass from Brister (Anderson kick)
 New York Jets – FG Leahy 41
 New York Jets – Shuler 2 pass from O'Brien (Leahy kick)
 New York Jets – Hector 2 run (Leahy kick)
 Pittsburgh – FG Anderson 21
 New York Jets – McNeil 5 run (Leahy kick)
 PIttsburgh – Jackson 17 run (Anderson kick)

Week 10

Week 11 

Scoring drives:

 Pittsburgh – FG Anderson 52
 Pittsburgh – Hoge 13 pass from Lipps (Anderson kick)
 Philadelphia – Byars 1 run (Zendejas kick)
 Pittsburgh – FG Anderson 21
 Philadelphia – Cunningham 7 run (Zendejas kick)
 Pittsburgh – FG Anderson 29
 Philadelphia – FG Zendejas 34
 Pittsburgh – Lipps 89 pass from Brister (Anderson kick)
 Philadelphia – Cunningham 12 run (Zendejas kick)
 Pittsburgh – FG Anderson 41
 Philadelphia – FG Zendejas 18

Week 12  

Scoring drives:

 Cleveland – FG Bahr 32
 Cleveland – Tennell 2 pass from Kosar (Bahr kick)
 Cleveland – Minnifield 11 blocked punt return (Bahr kick)
 Pittsburgh – Carter 1 run (Anderson kick)
 Cleveland – Langhorne 77 pass from Kosar (Bahr kick)
 Cleveland – FG Bahr 34

Week 13  

Scoring drives:

 PIttsburgh – FG Anderson 23
 PIttsburgh – FG Anderson 20
 Kansas City – Paige 4 pass from DeBerg (Lowery kick)
 Pittsburgh – Hoge 10 run (Anderson kick)
 Pittsburgh – FG Anderson 22
 Kansas City – FG Lowery 26

Week 14   

Scoring drives:

 Pittsburgh – FG Anderson 45
 Houston – FG Zendejas 36
 Pittsburgh – Stone 92 kickoff return (Anderson kick)
 Houston – Rozier 6 pass from Moon (Zendejas kick)
 Houston – FG Zendejas 41
 Pittsburgh – Lipps 80 pass from Brister (Anderson kick)
 Pittsburgh – 65 pass from Brister (Anderson kick)
 Houston – White 90 kickoff return (Zendejas kick)
 Houston – Moon 2 run (Zendejas kick)
 Pittsburgh – Hoge 2 run (Anderson kick)
 Houston – Moon 3 run (Zendejas kick)
 PIttsburgh – Hoge 16 pass from Brister (kick failed)

Week 15  

Scoring drives:

 San Diego – Flutie 6 pass from Malone (DeLine kick)
 San Diego – Malone 1 run (DeLine kick)
 San Diego – FG DeLine 24
 Pittsburgh – Gothard 3 pass from Brister (Anderson kick)
 Pittsburgh – Brister 3 run (Anderson kick)
 San Diego – FG DeLine 42

Week 16  

Scoring drives:

 Pittsburgh – Woodruff 78 interception return (Anderson kick)
 Miami – Hampton 4 run (Reveiz kick)
 Miami – FG Reveiz 20
 Pittsburgh – Lipps 39 run (Anderson kick)
 Miami – Hampton 1 run (Reveiz kick)
 Pittsburgh – FG Anderson 34
 Pittsburgh – FG Anderson 43
 Pittsburgh – Carter 1 run (Anderson kick)
 Pittsburgh – FG Anderson 34
 Pittsburgh – Jordan 28 interception return (Anderson kick)
 Pittsburgh – FG Anderson 22
 Miami – Clayton 13 pass from Jaworski (Reveiz kick)

Standings

References

External links
 1988 Pittsburgh Steelers season at Profootballreference.com 
 1988 Pittsburgh Steelers season statistics at jt-sw.com 

Pittsburgh Steelers seasons
Pittsburgh Steelers
Pitts